Dai Xianglong (born 1 October 1944) is a Chinese politician. He is the former governor of the People's Bank of China, and the former mayor of Tianjin. He currently serves as the president and Chinese Communist Party (CCP) party chief of the National Council for Social Security Fund.

Biography
Born in Yizheng, Jiangsu Province, Dai graduated from the department of accounting of the Central Institute of Finance and Economics (now the Central University of Finance and Economics), majoring in financial accounting. He joined the Chinese Communist Party in May 1973.

After graduation, he served as an accountant at the finance office of the Guishan Coal Mine in Yunnan, an official in its propaganda office, vice secretary of the CCP committee at the second industrial zone, and an official at the political department of the Coal Industrial Bureau in Yunnan. Later, he moved to Jiangsu and became an official of the Agricultural Bank of China Jiangsu Branch, vice director of its appropriation office, vice mayor of Feng County of Jiangsu, and vice governor of the Agricultural Bank of China Jiangsu Branch.  From 1985 to 1995, he served as vice governor of the Agricultural Bank of China, general manager, vice president and CCP party chief of the Bank of Communications, and vice governor and deputy party chief of the People's Bank of China.

He was appointed as governor and CCP party chief of the People's Bank of China in June 1995. Since then, he has become well recognized. In June 2001, he was additionally appointed as vice secretary of the central finance commission. During his tenure as governor of China's central bank, Dai presided over 9 consecutive interest rate reductions, earning him the nickname of "governor who lowers the interest rate".

In December 2002, he was appointed vice secretary of the CCP Tianjin municipal committee, and vice mayor and acting mayor of Tianjin. He was confirmed as mayor in January 2003. On December 28, 2007, Dai resigned as mayor of Tianjin, and vice mayor Huang Xingguo succeeded him in this post. The secretary of the CCP Tianjin committee, Zhang Gaoli, commented on Dai Xianglong, "Dai was very devoted to the fast development of Tianjin. He had great passion for the officials and people of Tianjin. The people of Tianjin won't forget his contributions......".

On January 30, 2008, the State Council appointed Dai as the president and party chief of the National Council for Social Security Fund, in charge of the national fund of 740 billion RMB (yuan).

Dai is a senior economist and a research fellow. He was an alternate member of the 14th Central Committee of the Chinese Communist Party, and a full member of the 15th, 16th and 17th Central Committees.

References

|-

Living people
1944 births
Agricultural Bank of China people
Businesspeople from Jiangsu
Central University of Finance and Economics alumni
Governors of the People's Bank of China
Mayors of Tianjin
People from Yangzhou
People's Republic of China politicians from Jiangsu